Bala Chitto Creek is a stream in the U.S. states of Louisiana and Mississippi. It is a tributary to the Tangipahoa River.

Bala Chitto is a name derived from the Choctaw language.

References

Rivers of Louisiana
Rivers of Tangipahoa Parish, Louisiana
Rivers of Mississippi
Rivers of Pike County, Mississippi
Mississippi placenames of Native American origin
Louisiana placenames of Native American origin